Come on Feel the Lemonheads is the sixth studio album by American alternative rock band the Lemonheads. It was released on October 12, 1993. Produced by The Robb Brothers, the band lineup consisted of Evan Dando (lead vocals, guitar), Nic Dalton (bass guitar) and David Ryan (drums), along with former bassist Juliana Hatfield singing backing vocals on several tracks.  The album was written by Dando and his songwriting partner Tom Morgan. Following the success of their prior album, It's a Shame About Ray, the band had attracted considerable media attention as alternative rock darlings, and some big-name guest musicians appeared on the album as well, including the Go-Go's lead singer Belinda Carlisle and funk musician Rick James. The song "Into Your Arms", a cover version of a song written and recorded previously by Dalton's former band, became the Lemonheads' biggest charting hit.

Reception

Following on from the success of the previous album, It's a Shame About Ray, Come on Feel the Lemonheads reached number 56 on the Billboard 200, making it the Lemonheads' highest ever chart position to date. The album produced the singles "It's About Time", "Big Gay Heart", "The Great Big No" and their highest charting single, "Into Your Arms", which reached number one on Billboard's Modern Rock Tracks for nine weeks (from November 6, 1993 to January 1, 1994), a record at the time which they shared with U2.

Track listing
All songs written and composed by Evan Dando and Tom Morgan, except as noted.
 "The Great Big No" – 2:51
 "Into Your Arms" (Robyn St. Clare) – 2:44
 "It's About Time" – 2:41
 "Down About It" – 2:15
 "Paid to Smile" (Dando) – 2:59
 "Big Gay Heart" – 4:37
 "Style" – 2:12
 "Rest Assured" – 2:32
 "Dawn Can't Decide" (Nic Dalton, Dando) – 2:18
 "I'll Do It Anyway" (Dando) (featuring Belinda Carlisle) – 3:34
 "Rick James Style" – 3:18
 "Being Around" – 1:48
 "Favorite T" (Dando) – 2:59
 "You Can Take It with You" (Dando) – 2:05
 "The Jello Fund" (Dando) – 15:32
 Following "The Jello Fund" are several hidden tracks titled "Lenny" (Dalton, Dando, David Ryan), "Noise Parts 1–3", "The Amp Went Out" and "High-Speed Idiot Mode".

Personnel
 Evan Dando – lead vocals, guitar, piano
 Nic Dalton – bass guitar, backing vocals
David Ryan – drums
 Juliana Hatfield – backing vocals
 Belinda Carlisle – backing vocals on "I'll Do It Anyway"
 Rick James – backing vocals on "Rick James Style"
 Sneaky Pete Kleinow – steel guitar on "Being Around" and "Big Gay Heart"
 Tom Morgan – "guidance counselor" on "You Can Take It with You"

Charts

Certifications

References

1993 albums
Atlantic Records albums
The Lemonheads albums